An Aryan paragraph was a clause in the statutes of an organization, corporation, or real estate deed that reserved membership and/or right of residence solely for members of the "Aryan race" and excluded from such rights any non-Aryans, particularly those of Jewish and Slavic descent. They were an omnipresent aspect of public life in Germany and Austria from 1885 to 1945.

One of the first documented examples of such a paragraph was written by the Austrian nationalist leader and anti-Semite Georg von Schönerer in his nationalistic Linz Program of 1882, and countless German national sports-clubs, song societies, school clubs, harvest circles and fraternities followed suit.

In Nazi Germany

The best-known Aryan paragraphs are in the legislation of Nazi Germany. They served to exclude Jews from organizations, federations, political parties, and, ultimately, all public life. Besides Jews, people not considered Aryans included Poles, Serbs, Russians, and other Slavs.

Based on the bylaws and programs of antisemitic organizations and parties of the late 19th century (such as the German Social Party in 1889), the Aryan Paragraph first appeared in the Third Reich in the formulation of the Law for the Restoration of the Professional Civil Service, which was passed on 7 April 1933. It stipulated that only those of Aryan descent, i.e. without Jewish parents or grandparents, could be employed in the civil service. The Aryan Paragraph was extended to education on 25 April 1933, in the Law against the Overcrowding of German Schools and Universities.

On June 30 of the same year, it was broadened to entail that even marriage to a "non-Aryan" sufficed for exclusion from a civil service career. In keeping with Nazi synchronization (Gleichschaltung), Nazi Party pressure led many federations and organizations to adopt the Aryan Paragraph. Thus, Jews were barred from the public health system, honorary public offices, editorial offices (Editor Law) and theaters (Reichskulturkammer), and agriculture (Reichserbhofgesetz), a progression culminating in the Nuremberg Laws "for the final separation of Jewry from the German Volk". Prior to this, there were exceptions, such as combat veterans, service in the National Rising [Erhebung], honorary Aryans, and so on, but now Jews and "Jewish mixed-breeds" (Mischlinge) were confronted with a ban in nearly all professions. The Aryan Paragraph was accepted largely without protest, except within the Evangelical Church, when it provoked the splitting off of the Confessing Church.

See also
 Ahnenpass
 Anti-Slavic sentiment
 Aryan certificate
 Ethnic cleansing
 Frontkämpferprivileg

References

Sources
 
 
 
The information about Germany and Austria was translated from the German Wikipedia article on this subject.

Aryanism
Nazi terminology
Holocaust racial laws
Real estate in Austria
Real estate in Germany
Repealed German legislation
Antisemitism in Austria
Antisemitism in Germany
Anti-Slavic sentiment